Pogoanele is a town in the southeastern part of Buzău County, Muntenia, Romania. The town administers one village, Căldărăști.

Pogoanele was declared a town in April 1989, as a result of the Romanian rural systematization program. It is traversed by the DN2C road, which runs  from Buzău to Slobozia. The railway station ( from the town center) is on the CFR line connecting Urziceni and Făurei.

Natives of the town include Ion A. Rădulescu-Pogoneanu and Ilie Stan.

Notes

Towns in Romania
Populated places in Buzău County
Localities in Muntenia